Terry A. Willkom (born February 23, 1943, in Stanley, Wisconsin) is a former member of the Wisconsin State Assembly. He graduated from McDonell Central Catholic High School in Chippewa Falls, Wisconsin and the University of Wisconsin-Eau Claire.

Career
Willkom was a member of the Assembly from 1970 to 1976. Additionally, he was Chairman of the Chippewa County, Wisconsin Democratic Party.

References

People from Stanley, Wisconsin
Politicians from Chippewa Falls, Wisconsin
Democratic Party members of the Wisconsin State Assembly
University of Wisconsin–Eau Claire alumni
1943 births
Living people